Jun Ji-hyun (born Wang Ji-hyun on 30 October 1981), also known by her English name Gianna Jun, is a South Korean actress and model. She has received multiple awards, including two Grand Bell Awards for Best Actress and a Daesang (Grand Prize) for Television at the Baeksang Art Awards.

Jun rose to fame for her role as The Girl in the romantic comedy film My Sassy Girl (2001), which became a tremendous sensation across Asia and sparked an international breakthrough for Korean cinema. Other notable films include Il Mare (2000), Windstruck (2004), The Thieves (2012), The Berlin File (2013) and Assassination (2015). She also starred in television series My Love from the Star (2013–2014), The Legend of the Blue Sea (2016–2017) and Jirisan (2021), as well as the Netflix series Kingdom (2020–present).

Jun Ji-hyun's success in film and television has established her as a top Hallyu star. She is referred to as one of "The Troika" along with Kim Tae-hee and Song Hye-kyo, collectively known by the acronym "Tae-Hye-Ji".

Early life and education
Jun was born in Seoul, South Korea. She has a brother who is five years older. Her mother and her mother's friends all encouraged her to be a model or actress due to her height and slim figure. Her childhood dream was to become a flight attendant, but she changed her mind after a  flight. In 1997, at the age of 16, she followed her high school female senior and began her career as a model for Ecole Magazine. In 1998, she debuted as an actress and adopted the stage name Jun Ji-hyun, at the suggestion of a producer.

Jun attended college at Dongguk University and graduated in 2004 with a bachelor's degree in Theater and Film. She later enrolled in Dongguk University's graduate school of Digital Media and Contents in 2011 and obtained a master's degree.

Career

1997–2005: Career beginnings and breakthrough
Jun first became well known as a commercial model and as a TV actress. Although she made her film debut in the little-watched White Valentine in 1999, it was not until later in the year when she was featured in a commercial for Samsung My Jet Printer that she became a popular sensation. The dancing and attitude expressed in the ad made her into an icon for Koreans in their late teens and early twenties.

The following year, Jun made her first well-publicized film appearance in late 2000 with Il Mare, a handsomely shot melodrama set on Ganghwa Island. The film did respectably well at the box office (despite opening on the same day as blockbuster Joint Security Area) and solidified her status as a star. It was later remade in Hollywood under the title 'Lake House' for the first time in a Korean film starring Sandra Bullock and Keanu Reeves.

Jun's breakout film was comedy My Sassy Girl, a tale of a gullible college student and his slightly unhinged girlfriend. Jun's "sassy, loud, and domineering character while also embodying traits of a pure-hearted girl" ran contrary to gender norms in Asia. The film became the highest grossing Korean comedy of all time in Korea and also spent two weeks at No. 1 in Hong Kong, launching Jun into pan-Asia stardom as one of the biggest Hallyu stars in the Chinese-language market. The huge success of My Sassy Girl also solidified Jun's domestic popularity, and she was given the title of the "Nation's First Love". Jun's growing popularity resulted in many companies requesting her endorsement. She also won the Best Actress award at the 2002 Grand Bell Awards.

In 2003, Jun starred in the psychological thriller film The Uninvited, which was rather well received by critics but failed to catch on with viewers. Throughout this time she was a constant presence in TV ads and on billboards in Korea and also in other Asian countries.

She reunited with Kwak Jae-yong, the director of My Sassy Girl, in 2004, appearing as a policewoman in romantic comedy Windstruck. However, viewers felt her role was too similar to My Sassy Girl. There were also signs that her popularity had started to suffer because of overexposure in advertisements. Nonetheless, Windstruck became the best-performing Korean film in Japan at the time, where My Sassy Girl was not as well known. In a 2005 survey of influential movie producers, she was ranked among the top ten most bankable stars in Korea.

Jun's next project Daisy teamed her with Jung Woo-sung (who frequently appeared together with her in Giordano and 2% Lotte Chilsung Water advertisements), and drew attention for its 100% location shooting in the Netherlands, and for using the Hong Kong director Andrew Lau (Infernal Affairs).

2006–2010: Hollywood debut

In late 2006, it was announced that Jun would be making her long-predicted jump to Hollywood as the lead role in Blood: The Last Vampire. She went through three months of hard training to play the sword-wielding martial arts heroine. During the filming and promotions for the movie prior to its 2009 release, she adopted the Westernized name Gianna Jun. Jun then launched her own luxury jeans brand in 2008, named "Gianna by True Religion", her first celebrity line. She was reportedly involved in every stage of their production, from design to deciding on fit and wash and their decoration with accessories.

For the film A Man Who Was Superman, Jun cut off her signature long silky hair to play a cynical documentary producer who meets an odd, Hawaiian-shirt-clad modern-day hero who battles urban apathy and preaches the virtues of lending a hand. Of initially feeling pressured at the opportunity to work with acclaimed actor Hwang Jung-min, she said, "Although luck was probably involved, I think it's destiny for an actor to 'meet' new work. On the first day I met him, I realized that I have much to learn from him, not only from his acting, but also as an individual."

In 2010, she acted opposite Chinese actress Li Bingbing in the English-language film  Snow Flower and the Secret Fan, based on Lisa See's bestselling novel of the same name, which was directed by Wayne Wang (The Joy Luck Club). The film, set in remote 19th-century China, features the lifelong friendship between two women, Lily and Snow Flower, and their imprisonment imposed by the strict cultural codes of conduct for women at that time. She was photographed by Annie Leibovitz for the July issue of the American edition of Vogue, the first Korean actress to be included in the iconic fashion magazine.

2012–present: Career resurgence and return to television

As part of the star-studded cast of The Thieves, Jun was a scene stealer in Choi Dong-hoon's 2012 heist film about thieves from Korea and China who team up together to steal a diamond worth , which is locked in a special room at a casino in Macau. The Thieves became the second top-selling Korean film of all time.

She next played a translator married to a North Korean intelligence agent in the 2013 spy thriller The Berlin File, and director Ryoo Seung-wan praised Jun's action scenes and her North Korean dialect. Jun's success on the big screen reaffirmed her status as one of the top actresses in Korea, as well as being one of the biggest box office draw in chungmuro.

14 years after Happy Together in 1999, Jun made her highly anticipated return to television in fantasy romance My Love from the Star, opposite her The Thieves co-star Kim Soo-hyun.  Jun plays a present-day top actress who falls in love with an alien who landed on earth 400 years ago during the Joseon Dynasty, played by Kim. The series was a ratings success, sparking trends in fashion, make-up and restaurants. Jun won the Daesang (or "Grand Prize"), the highest award for television, at the 2014 Baeksang Arts Awards and the 2014 SBS Drama Awards. The drama reestablished Jun as a leader of the Hallyu, and she was given the President's Award at the Korean Popular Culture and Arts Awards.

In 2015, she reunited with director Choi Dong-hoon for Assassination, an espionage action film set during the 1930s colonial era in which she played a sniper who assembles a squad of independence fighters to kill a Japanese army commander and a pro-Japanese Korean business tycoon. The film was another box-office success for Choi and Jun; Assassination was the highest-grossing Korean film of the year as well as the seventh all-time highest-grossing film in Korean cinema history. Jun was awarded Best Actress at the Grand Bell Awards and Max Movie Awards.

In January 2016, Korean entertainment and media company CJ E&M acquired her agency Culture Depot. The same year, Jun was ranked 8th on Forbes Korea Power Celebrity. It was her second consecutive year in the top 10, having been ranked 4th in 2015.

In November 2016, Jun made her small-screen comeback in the SBS fantasy romance drama The Legend of the Blue Sea with Lee Min-ho, reuniting with My Love from the Star scriptwriter Park Ji-eun. Jun ranked 9th on Gallup Korea's list of the 10 best actors of 2016, becoming the only woman to be included.

In March 2020, Jun made a short appearance in the second season of the Netflix period zombie thriller Kingdom. She was later confirmed to reprise her role and lead the series' sidequel Kingdom: Ashin of the North, alongside her Assassination co-star Park Byung-eun. The Netflix special episode was released worldwide on July 23, 2021.

In April 2020, Jun was confirmed to lead tvN mystery thriller drama Jirisan, written by Kingdom screenwriter Kim Eun-hee, opposite Ju Ji-hoon. The series premiered on October 23, 2021. Jun's 2021 projects marked her small-screen comeback after nearly 5 years of hiatus.

In May 2022, an official from Culture Depot said that her agency's contract expires in June 2022. Later, in August Jun has signed with new agency, Ieum Hashtag.

Personal life
Jun married Choi Joon-hyuk on April 13, 2012, at Shilla Hotel in Jangchung-dong, central Seoul, with more than 600 guests, including celebrities, close friends and family attending the wedding. Choi, a banker, is the grandson of famed hanbok designer Lee Young-hee and the son of fashion designer Lee Jung-woo. Congratulatory money from the wedding was donated to charity.

Jun gave birth to the couple's first child, a boy, on February 10, 2016, and second son on January 26, 2018.

Legal
Jun along with six other Korean stars (Jung Woo-sung, Kim Sun-a, Jo In-sung, Ji Jin-hee, Cha Tae-hyun and Yang Jin-woo) sued the monthly movie magazine Screen in 2006 for commercially using their pictures without permission.

In 2009, police discovered that Jun's cell phone had been illegally cloned. Seoul Metropolitan Police arrested a private detective, identified as Kim, who testified that it was ordered by SidusHQ (Jun's then agency of 13 years), for which he was paid  in cash by the brother of the agency's founder and then CEO Jung Hoon-tak. Police said Jun's management company used the cloned phone to keep tabs on her in an attempt to exert control over all aspects of her life. SidusHQ denied the allegations. Jung Hoon-tak was later cleared after police could not find any concrete evidence of his direct involvement. Kim was sentenced to one year in prison for invasion of privacy, Jung's brother received suspended jail terms. Because of the scandal, many expected her to leave once her contract expired, but she surprisingly extended her contract with SidusHQ for one more year. Then in 2011 she set up her own management agency, J&Co. Entertainment, before moving to Culture Depot, an agency owned by a close friend, in 2012.

In 2011, SidusHQ CEO Jung Hoon-tak was accused of illegally using Jun's bank account to pocket profits from a merger and acquisition. Jung allegedly made  after purchasing a stake in the junior KOSDAQ-listed Stom E&F in 2009 with an account under Jun's name and announcing through a public filing several months later that he would buy Stom E&F. Jung and Stom E&F's former CEO Kwon Seung-shik were reported for gaining unfair profits by leaking information on the M&A beforehand. In an investigation by the Financial Supervisory Service, Jun testified that she was unaware of such an account existing under her name. Jung issued a denial.

Philanthropy 
In 2014, Jun donated  million to the Korean Red Cross Society for the victims of the Sewol ferry disaster. She continued making donations of  million to the Hope Bridge Disaster Relief Association, to aid efforts for the COVID-19 pandemic in 2020, and to help victims of the wildfire that had started in Uljin, Gyeongbuk in 2022.

Filmography

Film

Television series

Television show

Music video appearances

Endorsements
Jun is one of the most in-demand celebrity endorsers in South Korea. In 2014, she earned an estimated  from advertising and endorsement fees. Market research in that same year showed that based on the value of real estate holdings, she ranked first among South Korean female celebrities, and fourth out of both male and female. In 2016, Jun earned ₩14 billion for the 14 commercials she has filmed, regaining her position at the top of advertisement rankings.

A lipstick she wore on My Love from the Star, YSL "Rouge Pur Couture No. 52" sold out worldwide, while the same coat she wore on the show caused a surge in sales of over 2,500 in ShesMiss stores in ten days. 

In 2015, Jun has been selected by Italian luxury fashion house Gucci as the new face for the brand's Asia exclusive Spring/Summer 2015 Accessories Campaign. The campaign shot in minimalistic aesthetic style, features Gucci accessories bearing its icons - the Horsebit, the Interlocking Gs and Gucci Flora and photographs taken by Sølve Sundsbø in London.

In February 2020, LG Household & Health Care had selected her as the new global ambassador of luxury beauty brand SU:M37. 

In 2020, Jun became first Korean ambassador of Alexander McQueen.

In September 2022, Jun became the first South Korean female artist to become Global Ambassador for British luxury fashion house Burberry.

Awards and nominations

Listicles

References

External links

  
 
 
 

South Korean film actresses
South Korean television actresses
South Korean female models
South Korean Buddhists
IHQ (company) artists
Actresses from Seoul
Dongguk University alumni
1981 births
Living people
20th-century South Korean actresses
21st-century South Korean actresses
Best New Actress Paeksang Arts Award (film) winners